SB-649868 is a dual orexin receptor antagonist that was being developed by GlaxoSmithKline as a treatment for insomnia.

A phase I clinical trial evaluated doses up to 80 mg, resulting in significant improvement in sleep latency without adverse effects. In randomized, double-blind, placebo-controlled crossover trials, the 10 and 30 mg doses increased sleep time and reduced sleep latency. The subsequent phase II study added a 60 mg dose and observed dose-dependent sleep promotion.

The compound no longer appears to be under active development, with the last study posted to ClinicalTrials.gov completed in 2010.

See also 
 Almorexant
 Filorexant
 Lemborexant
 Suvorexant

References

Further reading 

 
 

Hypnotics
Sedatives
Orexin antagonists
Benzofurans
Fluoroarenes